Miss Polski is a national beauty pageant in Poland to select the official ambassador of Poland at the Miss Universe, Miss International and Miss Supranational pageants. This pageant is one of famous Polish national pageant after Miss Polonia pageant. This pageant is not related to the Miss Polonia pageant.

International crowns 
 Three – Miss International winners: 
 Malgorzata Rozniecka (2001)
 Agnieszka Pachałko  (1993)
 Agnieszka Kotlarska (1991)
 One – Miss Supranational winner: Monika Lewczuk (2011)

Titleholders

Winners by Voivodeships

Voivodeships yet to win:
 Holy Cross
 Subcarpathia

Titleholders under Miss Polski org.

Miss Universe Poland

The main of Miss Polonia represents her country at Miss Universe. Since Miss Polonia is the only one who franchised the Miss Universe Organization, sometimes the organization designated the runner-up or contestant to be "Miss Universe Poland". Began 2019 the winner of Miss Polski competes at Miss Universe competition. On occasion, when the winner does not qualify (due to age) for either contest, a runner-up is sent.

Miss Supranational Poland 

The winner of Miss Polski usually competes in the Miss Supranational pageant. Sometimes a Runner-up or finalist is sent instead of the winner.

Miss International Poland

In the beginning the winner of Miss Juwenaliów 1959 participated at Miss International. Since 1985 the Miss International Poland will be selected by Miss Polonia, Miss Polski or one of runners-up from Miss Polonia or Miss Polski pageant. As of 2015 Miss International franchise handled by Miss Polski Organization.

Past titleholders under Miss Polski org.

Miss World Poland

Miss Polonia started to be franchise holder in 1983, from 1983 to 2007 the Miss Polonia was selecting the winner or runner-up to Miss World competition. From 2007 to 2014 the license of Miss World bought to Miss Polski and continued between 2015 and 2017 the Miss World Poland contest independently selected the winner to Miss World. Started in 2018 the Miss Polonia returned to be national franchise holder of Miss World.

Miss Europe Poland

The winner of Miss Polski also competed in the Miss Europe pageant.

(***) The city of Wilno or Vilnius becomes part of the independent Lithuania.
(****) As of 1991 Lwów or Lviv becomes part of the independent Ukraine.

Miss Grand Poland

See also

Miss Polonia
Miss World Poland
Miss Earth Poland

References

External links
Official Website

 
Poland
Poland
Poland
Poland
Beauty pageants in Poland
Recurring events established in 1990
1990 establishments in Poland
Polish awards